Bobby Tucker (born Robert Nathaniel Tucker; January 8, 1923 – April 12, 2007) was a pianist and arranger during the jazz era from the 1940s into the 1960s. He is most famous for being Billie Holiday's accompanist from 1946 to 1949 and Billy Eckstine's from 1950 to 1993.

Music career

Billie Holiday
On November 12, 1946, during Billie Holiday's stay at the Down Beat Club, Bobby Tucker was drafted to accompany Holiday because Eddie Heywood refused his opportunity. Billie's stay at the Down Beat was so successful due to Tucker's playing that she decided to keep him as her accompanist. The partnership lasted until 1949, where Tucker quit due to Holiday's abusive lover, John Levy, threatening him. (Not to be confused with John Levy the bass player and talent manager).

Billy Eckstine
After leaving Holiday in 1949, Bobby Tucker began playing for Billy Eckstine. Not much is known about this partnership, but there is a 1960 album, No Cover, No Minimum which features Tucker playing piano for Eckstine. On the 1959 album Basie/Eckstine Incorporated, on which Eckstine sang with the Count Basie Orchestra, Tucker is credited with the arrangements for eight of the eleven tracks, and he replaced Basie at the piano on most of the cuts as well.

In 1960 Tucker also released his own album under his own name, Too Tough. In 1973 Tucker played for Billy Eckstine at the Hobart (Tasmania, Australia) Wrest Point Casino.
From the time Tuck, as "Mr. B" called him, met Eckstine, they were very good friends till Eckstine's death in 1993. Eckstine called Tucker a brother he never had; as he would say, Tuck was his right tonsil. Tucker was more like part of the Eckstine family.

Tucker died of a heart attack at the age of 84, on April 12, 2007.

Further reading

External links 

 
 
 
 Bobby Tucker R.I.P.
Bobby Tucker Archival Collection Finding Aid

Notes 

1923 births
2007 deaths
American jazz pianists
American male pianists
American jazz singers
20th-century American pianists
American male jazz musicians
African-American pianists
20th-century African-American male singers